Keith Lovell Cash (born August 7, 1969) is a former professional American football tight end in the National Football League (NFL). He played six seasons in the NFL, one for the Pittsburgh Steelers and five for the Kansas City Chiefs.  As a collegian, he played wide receiver at the University of Texas, catching a total of 56 passes for 921 yards and 13 touchdowns over four seasons. He is best remembered at UT for catching the game-winning touchdown pass on 4th down from Texas quarterback Peter Gardere in a rivalry game against Oklahoma which enabled UT to win the game 14-13 in 1990.

Cash was drafted by the Washington Redskins in the 7th round of the 1991 NFL Draft, but was released before the start of the season.  He then signed on with Pittsburgh and played in five games with them, catching 7 passes.  In 1992, he signed with the Chiefs and spent the rest of his career there.  His best season was in 1995, when he caught 42 passes for 419 yards.

Two of his most memorable NFL receptions were touchdown passes from Joe Montana. One was in Montana's first game against his former team, the San Francisco 49ers. The other was a 7-yard pass which was the Chiefs' first touchdown in a 28–20 divisional round victory over the Houston Oilers at the Astrodome on January 16, 1994. Cash finished the play by firing the football at an image of Oilers defensive coordinator Buddy Ryan's face on a banner hanging beyond the end zone. Holding no grudge against Ryan, he explained, "I saw it as I was crossing the goal line, and it was just impulse. I just let it fly."

Personal life
Keith's twin brother, Kerry Cash, played tight end with him at Texas. Both twin brothers played tight end in the NFL for six seasons.

As high school athletes, Keith and Kerry Cash led Oliver Wendell Holmes High School in San Antonio, Texas, to the 5A state semi-finals in football against Houston Yates in 1985 and to the 5A Texas state championship game in basketball in 1987. Keith excelled in track and field as well, winning the district championship in the 200 meters and the high jump in 1987.

Keith and Kerry Cash attended Pease Middle School in San Antonio, where they won the district championship in football, basketball, and track in 1982-1983.

References

1969 births
Living people
Players of American football from San Antonio
American football tight ends
Texas Longhorns football players
Pittsburgh Steelers players
Kansas City Chiefs players